In the 2011-12 season, Al Talaba will be competing in the Iraqi Premier League.

Squad

Transfers

In

Out

Matches

Competitive

Iraqi Premier League

External links
 Team players
 Transfers
 Iraqi League

Al Talaba
Al Talaba seasons